Torill, also written Toril and Thorill, is a Norwegian feminine given name. It may refer to:

 Toril Brekke (born 1949), Norwegian novelist and author
 Torill Eide (born 1950), Norwegian children's writer
 Torill Eidsheim (born 1970), Norwegian politician
 Torill Fjeldstad (born 1958), Norwegian alpine skier
 Torill Fonn (born 1967), Swedish ultramarathon runner
 Toril Førland (born 1954), Norwegian alpine skier
 Thorill Gylder (born 1958), Norwegian racewalker
 Toril Hallan, Norwegian ski-orienteering competitor
 Toril Hetland Akerhaugen (born 1982), Norwegian footballer
 Torhild Johnsen (born 1934), Norwegian politician
 Torill Kove (born 1958), Norwegian-born Canadian film director and animator
 Toril Marie Øie (born 1960), Norwegian judge
 Toril Moi (born 1953), American literature academic
 Torill Selsvold Nyborg (born 1952), Norwegian nurse, missionary and politician
 Torill Thorstad Hauger (1943–2014), Norwegian non-fiction writer and illustrator

See also
Toril (disambiguation)
Torhild, a related name

Norwegian feminine given names